The Hilltop may refer to:

 The Hilltop (newspaper), the student newspaper of Howard University in Washington, D.C.
 The Hilltop (novel), a 2013 Israeli novel by Assaf Gavron
 Hilltop, Columbus, Ohio
 "The Hilltop", a nickname for Georgetown University in Washington, D.C.
 "The Hilltop", a nickname for Saint Anselm College in Manchester, N.H.
 "The Hilltop", a nickname for Southern Methodist University in Dallas, TX
 Nickname for the University of San Francisco in San Francisco, CA
 Hilltop Park, an early Major League Baseball park in New York City